Žižice is a municipality and village in Kladno District in the Central Bohemian Region of the Czech Republic. It has about 700 inhabitants.

Administrative parts
Village of Drnov, Luníkov, Osluchov and Vítov are administrative parts of Žižice.

References

Villages in Kladno District